pForth (Portable Forth) is a portable implementation of the Forth programming language written in ANSI C. It differs from the other distributions of Forth in that it strives for portability over performance.

The pForth implementation of Forth is an open source programming language.

History
PForth started out as HForth, which was used in connection with the Hierarchical Music Specification Language, a music experimentation language developed by Phil Burk, Larry Polansky and David Rosenboom. Phil Burk ported the HForth kernel to C when he moved to the 3DO company. The newly ported Forth at 3DO had to run on many different systems including SUN, SGI, Macintosh, PC, Amiga, the 3DO ARM based Opera system, and the 3DO PowerPC based M2 system.

License
The pForth legal notice dedicates pForth and its source code to the public domain and allows for unlimited distribution, reproduction, and modification. The pertinent section reads as follows:

The pForth software code is dedicated to the public domain, and any third party may reproduce, distribute and modify the pForth software code or any derivative works thereof without any compensation or license. The pForth software code is provided on an "as is" basis without any warranty of any kind, including, without limitation, the implied warranties of merchantability and fitness for a particular purpose and their equivalents under the laws of any jurisdiction.

References

External links 
 Official Homepage
 pForth on GitHub
 pForth for Max OS X
 pForth for Debian
 pForth for MVS : MVS on the IBM System/370 is an EBCDIC platform.

Concatenative programming languages
Forth programming language family
Public-domain software with source code
Forth implementations